The 1962 Polish Speedway season was the 1962 season of motorcycle speedway in Poland.

Individual

Polish Individual Speedway Championship
The 1962 Individual Speedway Polish Championship was held on 2 September at Rzeszow.

Golden Helmet
The 1962 Golden Helmet organised by the Polish Motor Union (PZM) was the 1962 event for league's leading riders.

Calendar

Final classification
Note: Result from final score was subtracted with two the weakest events.

Team

Team Speedway Polish Championship
The 1962 Team Speedway Polish Championship was the 15th edition of the Team Polish Championship. Górnik Rybnik won the gold medal.

First League

Second League 

Play off
 Zielona Góra v Gorzów Wielkopolski 33:45, 25:52

References

Poland Individual
Poland Team
Speedway
1962 in Polish speedway